The Metauro is a river in the Marche region of central Italy.

The name of the river in Latin is Metaurus or Mataurus.

The source of the river is located near Monte dei Frati in the border region between the provinces of Pesaro e Urbino, Arezzo and Perugia. It flows east through Pesaro e Urbino near Mercatello sul Metauro, Sant'Angelo in Vado (where the river forms the Cascata del Sasso, "Waterfall of the Stone"), Urbania, Fermignano, Fossombrone (in whose territory it receives the waters of the Candigliano), and, after flowing into a tight valley, the Gola del Furlo, Montemaggiore al Metauro, from which it starts to flow in a plain area. The river flows northeast near Calcinelli, Saltara, Lucrezia, Cartoceto and Cuccurano before flowing into the Adriatic Sea near Fano.

Battles
Two battles were fought on the banks of Metauro in ancient times.

in 207 BC, Hasdrubal Barca, while marching to the aid of Hannibal, was defeated and slain by a Roman army led by the consuls Marcus Livius Salinator and Gaius Claudius Nero. The Battle of the Metaurus was the decisive battle of the Second Punic War. The exact site of the battle is uncertain; tradition places it between Fossombrone and the Furlo, but it is probable that it occurred nearer the Adriatic coast;
in 271, Roman Emperor Aurelian defeated in the Battle of Fano, fought near the river, the Alamanni, who had invaded the northern part of Italia the previous year.

References

Attribution

External links 
La Valle del Metauro Database about natural and human aspects of the valley
Il Giornale del Metauro on-line news from the valley towns and villages

Rivers of the Province of Pesaro and Urbino
Rivers of Italy
Adriatic Italian coast basins